Arnold Amstutz was a Swiss rower. He competed in the men's eight event at the 1948 Summer Olympics.

References

External links

Year of birth missing
Possibly living people
Swiss male rowers
Olympic rowers of Switzerland
Rowers at the 1948 Summer Olympics
Place of birth missing
20th-century Swiss people